Ifeoma may refer to:

 Ifeoma Aggrey-Fynn (1980–2015), Ghanaian-Nigerian media personality, writer and public speaker
 Ifeoma Ajunwa (born 1980), Nigerian-American writer and professor of labor relations, law, and history
 Ifeoma Dieke (born 1981), American-born Scottish football defender
 Ifeoma Iheanacho (born 1988), Nigerian wrestler
 Ifeoma Malo, Nigerian lawyer
 Ifeoma Mbanugo (born 1952), Nigerian long-distance runner
 Ifeoma Nwoye (born 1993), Nigerian wrestler
 Ifeoma Okoye, Nigerian author
 Ifeoma Onumonu, Nigerian professional footballer
 Ifeoma Onyefulu (born 1959), Nigerian children's author
 Ifeoma Ozoeze (born 1971), Italian heptathlete
Ifeoma Ozoma, American policy expert and equity advocate
 Ifeoma Uddoh, Nigerian social entrepreneur

Others
 "Ifeoma", a 1989 song by Felix Lebarty